Jelica Stanojević (born 1 July 1913, date of death unknown) was a Serbian athlete. She competed in the women's javelin throw at the 1936 Summer Olympics, representing Yugoslavia. She was the first woman to represent Yugoslavia at the Olympics.

References

1913 births
Year of death missing
Athletes (track and field) at the 1936 Summer Olympics
Serbian female javelin throwers
Olympic athletes of Yugoslavia
Athletes from Budapest